Nunnely is a surname. Notable people with the surname include:

Ché Nunnely (born 1999), Dutch footballer
Wayne Nunnely (1952-2021), American football player and coach

See also
Nunneley
Nunnally